Afzaal is a surname. Notable people with the surname include:

Aquib Afzaal (born 1985), English cricketer, brother of Kamran and Usman
Kamran Afzaal (born 1973), Pakistani-born English cricketer
Usman Afzaal (born 1977), Pakistani-born English cricketer

See also
 Afzal (disambiguation)